Bilel El Hamzaoui Bakna (born 1 April 1992) is a French professional footballer who plays as an attacking midfielder for AS Béziers.

Career
He made his professional debut for Angers in the 2–0 win against Metz on 20 December 2011, coming on as a substitute for Claudiu Keserü. During the 2012–13 season, he had a loan spell with Le Poiré-sur-Vie.

Personal life
El Hamzaoui was born in France and is of Moroccan descent.

References

External links
 
 
 

1992 births
Living people
Footballers from Montpellier
French footballers
French sportspeople of Moroccan descent
Association football midfielders
Angers SCO players
Vendée Poiré-sur-Vie Football players
CA Bastia players
USL Dunkerque players
AS Béziers (2007) players
Union Titus Pétange players
Ligue 2 players
Championnat National players
Championnat National 3 players
Luxembourg National Division players
French expatriate footballers
French expatriate sportspeople in Luxembourg
Expatriate footballers in Luxembourg